The Warrior's Apprentice is an English language science fiction novel by Lois McMaster Bujold, part of the Vorkosigan Saga. It was the second book published in the series, and is the fifth story, including novellas, in the internal chronology of the series. The Warrior's Apprentice was first published by Baen Books in 1986, and was included in the 1997 omnibus Young Miles.

Plot summary
When Miles Vorkosigan is disqualified from joining the Barrayaran Imperial Service Academy because he broke both his legs during the initial physical entrance exams, he sets about trying to prove himself a hero by other means. The resulting chain of events leads to his taking command of a company of space mercenaries, under the alias "Admiral Miles Naismith".

Reception
Jo Walton, writing for Tor.com, described The Warrior's Apprentice as having "about ninety percent more depth than you’d expect it to have", but also notes that "the series does get a lot deeper and more complex as it goes on from here."

Cover art
Maya Kaathryn Bohnhoff has reported being told by Bujold that the novel's cover art had originally been intended for a Keith Laumer novel, "(b)ut [Laumer] didn’t want it. So they painted Miles into the command chair and put some clothes on the woman."

References

1986 American novels
1986 science fiction novels
American science fiction novels
Novels by Lois McMaster Bujold
Vorkosigan Saga